Clyde Eugene Bennett (February 2, 1932 – December 13, 2021) was an American professional Canadian football end who played one season in the Interprovincial Rugby Football Union (IRFU) for the Ottawa Rough Riders. He played college football for South Carolina, being an All-American selection 1953. Bennett was a third-round selection in the 1954 NFL Draft by the New York Giants, but did not play for them.

Early life and education
Bennett was born on February 2, 1932, in St. Matthews, South Carolina. He attended St. Matthews High School, graduating in 1950 before joining the University of South Carolina. During the 1950 season, Bennett played on the South Carolina freshman football team. He made the varsity roster in the next three seasons, leading the team in receiving in 1952 and 1953. He made 34 catches for 502 yards in 1952 and 23 catches for 413 yards in 1953. Bennett was named third-team All-American following his senior year of 1953. He was inducted into the South Carolina Athletics Hall of Fame in 2003 and was described by The State as one of the top 50 greatest Gamecocks in 2017.

Professional career
Bennett was selected in the third round (28th overall) of the 1954 NFL Draft by the New York Giants, but instead played for the Ottawa Rough Riders of the Interprovincial Rugby Football Union (IRFU). With the Rough Riders he appeared in thirteen games, wearing number 71. As a receiver, he caught 26 passes for 321 yards.

Later life and death
Following the 1954 season, Bennett entered the United States Air Force, reaching the rank of Colonel. He arrived at Reese Air Force Base in 1957 for pilot training. There he met Dolores Roberson, who he married in 1960. He retired in 1978. Bennett died on December 13, 2021, at the age of 89.

References

Further reading
 

1932 births
2021 deaths
Players of American football from South Carolina
American football ends
South Carolina Gamecocks football players
New York Giants players
Ottawa Rough Riders players
People from St. Matthews, South Carolina